John Michael O'Neill (born 1903 in Harbour Grace) was a Canadian clergyman and prelate for the Roman Catholic Diocese of Grand Falls. He was appointed bishop in 1940. He died in 1974.

References 

1903 births
1974 deaths
Canadian Roman Catholic bishops